Trap is a subgenre of hip hop music that originated in the Southern United States in the 1990s. The genre gets its name from the Atlanta slang word "trap", a house used exclusively to sell drugs. Trap music uses synthesized drums and is characterized by complex hi-hat patterns, tuned kick drums with a long decay (originally from the Roland TR-808 drum machine), and lyrical content that often focuses on drug use and urban violence. It utilizes very few instruments and focuses almost exclusively on snare drums and double- or triple-timed hi-hats.

Pioneers of the genre include producers Kurtis Mantronik, Mannie Fresh, Shawty Redd, Fatboi, Zaytoven, DJ Screw and Toomp, along with rappers Young Jeezy, Gucci Mane and T.I. (who coined the term with his 2003 album Trap Muzik). The modern trap sound was popularized by producer Lex Luger, who produced the influential Waka Flocka Flame album Flockaveli in 2010, and cofounded the prolific hip-hop production team 808 Mafia.

Since crossing over into the mainstream in the 2010s, trap has become one of the most popular forms of American music, consistently dominating the Billboard Hot 100 throughout the decade, with artists such as Drake, Future, Cardi B, 21 Savage, Migos, Lil Uzi Vert, Post Malone, XXXTentacion,  Young Thug, and Travis Scott (among many others) all achieving No. 1s on the chart with songs featuring production inspired by the trap subgenre. It has influenced the music of many pop and R&B artists, such as Ariana Grande, Beyoncé, Miley Cyrus, Rihanna and more. Its influence can also be heard in reggaetón and K-pop. In 2018, hip-hop became the most popular form of music for the first time ever (according to Nielsen Data), coinciding with trap's continued rise in popularity. 2019 saw mega “Trap” hits such as Ariana Grande's “7 rings” pop-trap and spending 8 weeks at No. 1 on the “Billboard” Hot 100 chart. Another influenced song was the country-trap song "Old Town Road" by Lil Nas X (featuring Billy Ray Cyrus) broke the record for spending the most weeks (19 weeks) at No. 1 on the Billboard Hot 100 chart, as well as becoming the fastest song to reach a Diamond Certification.

Characteristics
In trap music, lyrical themes must revolve around the general life and culture in the "trap" or in the actual southern trap house where narcotics are being sold. The term "trap" refers to places where drug deals take place. Other topics also include street life, acquiring wealth, violence, American vehicles, and life experiences that artists have faced in their southern American surroundings.

Trap music employs multilayered thin- or thick-textured monophonic drones with sometimes a melodic accompaniment expressed with synthesizers; crisp, grimy, and rhythmic snares, deep 808 kick drums, double-time, triple-time, and similarly divided hi-hats, and a cinematic and symphonic use of synthesized string, brass, woodwind, and keyboard instruments to create an energetic, hard-hitting, deep, and variant atmosphere. These primary characteristics, the signature sound of trap music, originated from producer Shawty Redd. Trap may use a range of tempos, from 50 BPM (programmed at 100 BPM to achieve finer hi-hat subdivision) to 88 (176) BPM, but the tempo of a typical trap beat is around 70 (140) BPM.

History

1990s–2003: Origins
As rap grew, it created many forms such as gangsta rap, which shined more of a light on the dangerous lifestyle of those in American neighborhoods in poverty, and shined less of a light on political issues than the rap it originated from. As rap mutated into ‘gangsta’ rap, ‘gangsta’ rap would then transform to trap, a new form of music, that followed a different thought process and different tones. Early producers creating trap music included Lil Jon from Atlanta, Georgia, where the term originated as a reference to places where drug deals are made, who along with Mannie Fresh from New Orleans and DJ Paul from Memphis, Tennessee worked with local acts in Atlanta including Dungeon Family, Outkast, Goodie Mob, Three 6 Mafia, Tommy Wright III and Ghetto Mafia. In 1992, one of the earliest records to release was UGK's "Cocaine In The Back of the Ride" from their debut EP, "The Southern Way". Later in 1992, they released the popular "Pocket Full of Stones" from their major-label debut album Too Hard to Swallow. It was also featured in the 1993 film Menace II Society. In 1996, Master P released his single "Mr. Ice Cream Man" from his fifth studio album Ice Cream Man. Fans and critics started to refer to rappers whose primary lyrical topic was drug dealing as "trap rappers". T.I.’s 2001 song "Dope Boyz", from his debut album I'm Serious, includes the lyrics "the dope boyz in the trap nigga / the thug nigga, drug dealer where you at". David Drake of Complex wrote that "the trap in the early 2000s wasn't a genre, it was a real place", and the term was later adopted to describe the "music made about that place".

2003–2015: Rise in mainstream popularity
During the early- to mid-2000s, trap music began to emerge as a recognized genre after the mainstream success of a number of albums and singles with lyrics that covered life in "the trap", drug dealing and the struggle for success. Several Southern rappers with drug dealer personas such as T.I., Young Jeezy, Gucci Mane, Boosie Badazz, Young Dolph, Lil Wayne, and Rick Ross produced crossover hits and helped expand the popularity of the genre, with trap records beginning to appear more heavily on mixtapes and radio stations outside of the South. Though trap artists were somewhat diverse in their production styles, the signature and quintessential trap sound (typically based around synth, orchestra, and string swells with tight, bass-heavy 808 kick drums) that would come to be associated with the genre developed in Atlanta during trap's mid-2000s breakthrough. Some of the notable trap producers during the mid to late 2000s include DJ Toomp, Fatboi, Drumma Boy, Shawty Redd, D. Rich, and Zaytoven. The first wave of the trap sound was influenced by earlier Southern producers such as Lil Jon, Mannie Fresh, and DJ Paul.

By the end of the decade, a second wave of trap artists gained momentum and frequently topped the Billboard hip hop charts. Trap producer Lex Luger gained huge popularity, and produced more than 200 songs in 2010 and 2011, including a number of singles for mainstream rap artists such as Rick Ross' "B.M.F. (Blowin' Money Fast)". Since Luger's rise, his signature trap sound has been the heavy use of 808s, crisp snares, fast hihats, synth keys, and orchestration of brass, strings, woodwind, and keyboards. Many of his sounds have been adopted by other hip hop producers trying to replicate his success. As such, Luger is often credited with popularizing the modern trap sound. Since the 2010s, an array of modern trap producers have gained industry popularity, most notably 808 Mafia's Southside and TM88, Sonny Digital, Young Chop, DJ Spinz, Tay Keith and Metro Boomin. Some producers expanded their range to other genres, such as contemporary R&B (Mike WiLL Made It) and electronic music (AraabMuzik).

Throughout 2011 and 2012, trap music maintained a strong presence on the mainstream Billboard music charts with a number of records released by rappers such as Young Jeezy, Chief Keef and Future. Jeezy's single "Ballin" reached number 57 on the Billboard charts and was considered one of Jeezy's best tracks in some time. Future's single, "Turn On the Lights", was certified gold and entered at number 50 on the Billboard Hot 100 and Keef's "I Don't Like" and "Love Sosa" generated over 30 million views on YouTube, spawning a new subgenre within trap called drill. Music critics called drill production style the "sonic cousin to skittish footwork, southern-fried hip-hop and the 808 trigger-finger of trap". Young Chop is frequently identified by critics as the genre's most characteristic producer. The sound of trap producer Lex Luger's music is a major influence on drill, and Young Chop identified Shawty Redd, Drumma Boy and Zaytoven as important precursors to the drill movement. "I Don't Like" inspired fellow Chicago native, notable hip hop producer and rapper Kanye West to create a remix of the song, which was included on his label GOOD Music's compilation album Cruel Summer. Stelios Phili of GQ called trap music "the sound of hip hop in 2012".

Since maintaining a strong presence on the mainstream music charts, trap music has been influential to non-hip hop artists. R&B singer Beyoncé's songs "Drunk in Love", "Flawless" and "7/11", all from her 2013 album Beyoncé, also contained trap influences. American dance-pop singer Lady Gaga recorded a trap-inspired song titled "Jewels 'n Drugs" for her 2013 album Artpop, featuring rappers T.I., Too Short and Twista. The combination of pop and trap music was met with mixed responses from critics. In September 2013, American pop singer Katy Perry released a song titled "Dark Horse" featuring rapper Juicy J, from her 2013 album Prism, that incorporated trap elements. The song reached number one on the Billboard Hot 100 by the end of January 2014.

2015–present: Expansion and mainstream ubiquity

In May 2015, trap music once again surfaced to the top of mainstream music charts as New Jersey rapper Fetty Wap's hit single "Trap Queen" peaked at number two on the US Billboard Hot 100 chart. Fetty Wap's subsequent singles, "My Way" and "679", also reached the top 10 of the Billboard Hot 100 chart. Brooklyn-based rapper Desiigner gained major recognition in 2016 upon the release of "Panda" as his debut mixtape single which topped the US Billboard Hot 100 chart. The commercial success of trap songs also began to be assisted by Internet memes, as was the case with Rae Sremmurd and Gucci Mane's "Black Beatles," which reached number-one on the Billboard Hot 100 chart after exposure through the Mannequin Challenge Internet phenomenon. Similarly, in 2017 the collaboration between Migos and Lil Uzi Vert "Bad and Boujee", with the now popularly spread lyrics "Raindrop (Drip), Drop top (Drop Top)" reached number-one after internet meme exposure. 2 Chainz released his fourth studio album Pretty Girls Like Trap Music in June 2017. Rapper Cardi B became extremely popular with her song "Bodak Yellow", which went to number one on the Billboard Hot 100 in 2017.

In 2013, trap-influenced EDM came into the mainstream, popularized by producer DJ Snake.

In 2015, a new fusion of trap music named Latin trap began to emerge. Latin trap is similar to mainstream trap which details la calle', or the streets—hustling, sex, and drugs. Prominent artists of Latin trap include Bryant Myers, Anuel AA, Miky Woodz, Almighty, Maluma and Bad Bunny. In July 2017, The Fader wrote "Rappers from Puerto Rico have taken elements of trap—the lurching bass lines, jittering 808s and the eyes-half-closed vibe—and infused them into banger after banger." In an August 2017 article for Billboards series, "A Brief History Of", they enlisted some of the key artists of Latin trap—including Ozuna, De La Ghetto, Bad Bunny, Farruko and Arcángel—to narrate a brief history on the genre. Elias Leight of Rolling Stone noted "[Jorge] Fonseca featured Puerto Rican artists like Anuel AA, Bryant Myers and Noriel on the compilation Trap Capos: Season 1, which became the first "Latin trap" LP to reach number one on Billboards Latin Rhythm Albums chart." A remixed version of Cardi B's single "Bodak Yellow" (which had previously reached number one on the US Billboard Hot 100 chart), dubbed the "Latin Trap Remix", was officially released on August 18, 2017, and features Cardi B rapping in Spanish with Dominican hip hop recording artist Messiah contributing a guest verse. In November 2017, Rolling Stone wrote that "a surging Latin trap sound is responding to more recent developments as it fuses with Reggaeton, embracing the slow-rolling rhythms and gooey vocal delivery popularized by Southern hip-hop".

"Bubblegum rap" consists of a "booming, trap-laden" beat with "flavorful" elements and mumble rap. It is also described as "ushering in a new wave of Internet-born music stars".

On 5 May 2018, rapper and musician Childish Gambino released "This Is America", which is "built on the sharp contrast between jolly, syncretic melodies and menacing trap cadences". It debuted at number 1 on the Billboard Charts and was streamed over 65 million times in the first week of its release.

In 2018, in promotion for his album Dime Trap, T.I. opened a pop-up TrapMusic Museum in Atlanta: "We curated it from conception. The purpose of it was to acknowledge the most significant contributors to the culture. Secondly, inform those who may be least knowledgeable about the genre. And inspire those who are in the environment that inspires the genre." The museum also includes an escape room entitled 'Escape the Trap'.

In 2018, American pop-R&B singer Ariana Grande incorporated trap elements in her fourth studio album, Sweetener, while maintaining her signature pop-R&B sound. She furthered trap experimentation in "7 Rings," "Bad Idea," "In My Head" and "Break Up with Your Girlfriend, I’m Bored" from her fifth studio album Thank U, Next. Both Sweetener and Thank U, Next were critical and commercial successes, with the former winning the Grammy Award for Best Pop Vocal Album, and the latter breaking numerous streaming records and spawning two number one singles on the Billboard Hot 100. Grande's sixth studio album, Positions, is largely a trap-inspired R&B-pop album.

In 2019, Lil Nas X's "Old Town Road" crossed trap with Western and country music. In March 2019, the song debuted at number 19 on the Hot Country Songs before being removed from the chart a week later. A remix with Billy Ray Cyrus was released on April 5, 2019, and later became the longest-running number one hip-hop single of all time and the overall longest number one single of all time on the Billboard Hot 100, at 19 weeks, surpassing the record set by Mariah Carey and Boyz II Men's "One Sweet Day" and Luis Fonsi and Daddy Yankee's "Despacito" featuring Justin Bieber.

References

 Trap music
African-American music
Hip hop genres
American styles of music
Youth culture in the United States
Southern hip hop
1990s in American music
2000s in American music
2010s in American music
Music of Atlanta
Music of Houston
Music of Tennessee
20th-century music genres
21st-century music genres
2010s fads and trends
2020s in American music
2020s in music